Faïz Selemani (born 14 November 1993) is a professional footballer who plays as a winger for Belgian First Division A club KV Kortrijk. Born in France, he represents the Comoros national team at international level.

Club career
As a youth, Selemani played with Olympique de Marseille up to under-18 level before dropping into lower-league local football. He joined Championnat National side Consolat Marseille ahead of the 2014–15 season and scored two goals in 21 league appearances during his first year at the club. After scoring four goals in the first four games of the 2015–16 campaign, Selemani was signed by Ligue 2 club Chamois Niortais on 31 August 2015 on a three-year contract.

On 24 June 2016, Selemani joined Ligue 1 side Lorient on a four-year contract.

On 19 August 2019, he signed a three-year contract with Belgian club KV Kortrijk.

International career
Selemani was called up to the Comoros for 2019 Africa Cup of Nations qualifier against Malawi on 10 June 2017. He made his debut in a friendly 1–1 against Madagascar on 11 November 2017, wherein he assisted his side's only goal.

Career statistics

Club
.

International
Scores and results list Comoros goal tally first, score column indicates score after each Selemani goal.

References

External links
 

1993 births
Living people
Footballers from Marseille
Association football midfielders
Comorian footballers
Comoros international footballers
French footballers
French sportspeople of Comorian descent
Athlético Marseille players
Chamois Niortais F.C. players
FC Lorient players
Tours FC players
AC Ajaccio players
Royale Union Saint-Gilloise players
K.V. Kortrijk players
Ligue 1 players
Ligue 2 players
Championnat National players
Belgian Pro League players
Challenger Pro League players
Comorian expatriate footballers
French expatriate footballers
Expatriate footballers in Belgium
2021 Africa Cup of Nations players